The Crossosomatales are an order, first recognized as such by APG II. They are flowering plants included within the Rosid eudicots.

Description 
Species assigned to the Crossosomatales have in common flowers that are positioned solitarily, with the base of the calyx, corolla, and stamens fused into a tube-shaped floral cup, sepals overlapping, the outermost smaller than the inner. Insides of the casings of pollen grains have horizontally extended thin regions (or endo-apertures). The gynoecium is placed on a short stalk, papillae on the stigma consist of two or more cells, ovary locules taper upwards, and the protective cell layer (or integument) surrounding the ovule leaves a zigzag opening (or micropyle). Some cell clusters have bundles of long yellow crystals, mucilage cells are present, and seeds have a smooth, woody coating.

Taxonomy 
The relationships between orders within the Malvid clade, according to the APG system, is represented by the following tree.

Within the Crossosomatales, the APG III system of 2009 recognises families represented in the following tree.

References 

 Angiosperm Phylogeny website

 
Angiosperm orders